Military Assistance Advisory Group (MAAG) is a designation for United States military advisors sent to other countries to assist in the training of conventional armed forces and facilitate military aid.  Although numerous MAAGs operated around the world throughout the 1940s–1970s, including in Yugoslavia after 1951, the most famous MAAGs were those active in Southeast Asia before and during the Vietnam War. Typically, the personnel of MAAGs were considered to be technical staff attached to, and enjoying the privileges of, the US diplomatic mission in a country. "The special status of personnel serving in Military Advisory Assistance Groups (MAAG) results from their position as an integral part of the Embassy of the United States where they perform duty." Although the term is not as widespread as it once was, the functions performed by MAAGs continue to be performed by successor organizations attached to embassies, often called United States Military Groups (USMILGP or MILGRP).  The term MAAG may still occasionally be used for such organizations helping promote military partnerships with several Latin American countries such as Peru and the Dominican Republic as well as in African countries such as Liberia.

MAAG Indochina; MAAG Vietnam

In September 1950, US President Harry Truman sent the Military Assistance Advisory Group (MAAG) to Vietnam to assist the French in the First Indochina War.  The President claimed they were not sent as combat troops, but to supervise the use of $10 million worth of US military equipment to support the French in their effort to fight the Viet Minh forces. By 1953, aid increased dramatically to $350 million to replace old military equipment owned by the French.

The French Army, however, was reluctant to take U.S. advice, and would not allow the Vietnamese army to be trained to use the new equipment, because it went against French policy.  They were supposed to not only defeat enemy forces but to solidify themselves as a colonial power, and they could not do this with a Vietnamese army.  French commanders were so reluctant to accept advice that would weaken the time-honored colonial role that they got in the way of the various attempts by the MAAG to observe where the equipment was being sent and how it was being used.  Eventually, the French decided to cooperate, but at that point, it was too late.By 1954, the United States had spent $1 billion in support of the French military effort, shouldering 80 percent of the cost of the war. 

In 1954 the commanding general of French forces in Indochina, General Henri Navarre, allowed the United States to send liaison officers to Vietnamese forces. But it was too late, because of the siege and fall of Dien Bien Phu in the spring. As stated by the Geneva Accords, France was forced to surrender the northern half of Vietnam and to withdraw from South Vietnam by April 1956.

At a conference in Washington, D.C. on February 12, 1955, between officials of the U.S. State Department and the French Minister of Overseas Affairs, it was agreed that all U.S. aid would be funneled directly to South Vietnam and that all major military responsibilities would be transferred from the French to the MAAG under the command of Lieutenant General John O'Daniel. MAAG Indochina was renamed the MAAG Vietnam on November 1,1955, as the United States became more deeply involved in what would come to be known as the Vietnam War.

The next few years saw the rise of a Communist insurgency in South Vietnam, and President Diem looked increasingly to US military assistance to strengthen his position, albeit with certain reservations. Attacks on US military advisors in Vietnam became more frequent. On October 22, 1957, MAAG Vietnam and USIS installations in Saigon were bombed, injuring US military advisors. In the summer of 1959, Communist guerrillas staged an attack on a Vietnamese military base in Bien Hoa, killing and wounding several MAAG personnel. During this time, American advisors were not put in high-ranking positions, and President Diem was reluctant to allow American advisors into Vietnamese tactical units. He was afraid that the United States would gain control or influence over his forces if Americans got into the ranks of the army. The first signs that his position was beginning  to shift came in 1960, when the number of official US military advisors in the country was increased from 327 to 685 at the request of the South Vietnamese government. By 1961, communist guerrillas were becoming stronger and more active. This increased enemy contacts in size and intensity throughout South Vietnam. At this point, Diem was under pressure from US authorities to liberalize his regime and implement reforms. Although key elements in the US administration were resisting his requests for increased military funding and Army of the Republic of Vietnam (ARVN) troop ceilings, MAAG Vietnam played a significant role in advocating for a greater US presence in the country. Throughout this period relations between the MAAG Vietnam and Diem were described as "excellent", even though the advisors were doubtful of his ability to hold off the insurgency.

Newly elected President John F. Kennedy agreed with MAAG Vietnam's calls for increases in ARVN troop levels and the U.S. military commitment in both equipment and men. In response, Kennedy provided $28.4 million in funding for ARVN, and overall military aid increased from $50 million per year to $144 million in 1961. In the first year of the Kennedy administration, MAAG Vietnam worked closely with administration officials, USOM, and the US Information Service to develop a counterinsurgency plan (CIP). The CIP's main initiatives included the strengthening of ARVN to combat the Communist insurgency, which had the corollary effect of strengthening Diem's political position. At the same time President Diem agreed to the assignment of advisors to battalion level, significantly increasing the number of advisors; from 746 in 1961 to over 3,400 before MAAG Vietnam was placed under U.S. Military Assistance Command Vietnam (MACV) and renamed the Field Advisory Element, Vietnam. At the peak of the war in 1968, 9,430 US Army personnel, along with smaller numbers of US Navy, US Marine Corps, US Air Force and Australian Army personnel acted as advisors down to the district and battalion level to train, advise and mentor the Army of the Republic of Vietnam (ARVN), Republic of Vietnam Marine Corps, Republic of Vietnam Navy and the Republic of Vietnam Air Force.

MAAG Indochina had three commanders: BG Francis G. Brink (who committed suicide at The Pentagon on 24 June 1952), October 1950 – June 1952; MG Thomas J. H. Trapnell, June 1952 – April 1954; and LTG John W. O'Daniel, April 1954 – November 1955. MAAG Vietnam was commanded by LTG Samuel T. Williams, November 1955 – September 1960; LTG Lionel C. McGarr, September 1960 – January 1962; and GEN Paul D. Harkins, January 1962 – June 1964.

MAAG Thailand
As part of the military outreach of the USA to friendly countries in Southeast Asia, a MAAG was established in Bangkok, Thailand in September 1950 with Brigadier general John T. Cole as Group Chief.

It was replaced by the Joint United States Military Advisory Group Thailand in September 1953, which has operated until today.

MAAG Laos
MAAG Laos was preceded by the Programs Evaluation Office, established on 15 December 1955. Due to the limitations emplaced by international treaty, the PEO was set up with civilian personnel instead of a MAAG with military staff. When political changes superseded the treaty, MAAG Laos was established in 1961 to replace the Programs Evaluation Office in its support of the Royal Lao Army's fight against the communist Pathet Lao. On July 23, 1962, several interested countries agreed in Geneva to guarantee the neutrality and independence of Laos. As such, the US removed the MAAG, replacing it with a Requirements Office, which served as a convenient cover for the CIA activities.

One of MAAG Laos' commanders was Reuben Tucker.

MAAG Cambodia

MAAG Cambodia was established on June 4, 1955, pursuant to the United States-Royal Government of Cambodia agreement of May 16, 1955. This agreement included the introduction of high-ranking US military personnel to advise the Cambodian armed forces as non-combatants. The advisory group was staffed mainly by army personnel, with smaller contingents of navy and air force personnel.

As Cambodia's leadership took an official policy of neutrality in the Cold War, MAAG Cambodia's involvement in the country was terminated on November 20, 1963, by General Order 6, MAAG Cambodia, following the Cambodian government's cancellation of all U.S. aid.

MAAG, Republic of China

From 1951 until 1978, there was a Military Assistance Advisory Group to the Republic of China in Taiwan. From 1955, operational U.S. joint combat forces operating alongside the advisory group were directed by the United States Taiwan Defense Command.

The Military Assistance Advisory Group, Taiwan, commanded by Army Major General William C. Chase, was authorized 67 Army, 4 Navy and 63 Air Force personnel. Under the group's joint headquarters were Army, Navy and Air Force sections.  General Chase arrived at Taipei, Taiwan, on 1 May 1951 to begin carrying out his duties as the military member of a team, which was charged with insuring that all assistance granted the Chinese Nationalists was in furtherance of United States foreign policy.

After its arrival at Taiwan, the advisory group was reorganized and expanded.  The original three Service sections proved inadequate, so a joint technical service section was created as a counterpart to, and for advising, the Nationalist Army's Combined Service Force, which comprised the medical, signal, engineer, ordnance, transportation, chemical, and quartermaster services.  A Headquarters Commandant, on the same level as the four section chiefs, was made responsible for the routine tasks necessary to support the group. Military Assistance Advisory Group officers assisted their counterparts within the Nationalist Ministry of National Defense and the general headquarters.  Special teams were created as needed to provide aid at service schools and in tactical units.

On September 3, 1954, fourteen 120mm and 155mm Chinese Communist artillery in Xiamen (Amoy) and Dadeng (Tateng) fired six thousand rounds at the Kinmen (Quemoy) Islands in a five-hour period. Two Americans of the US Military Assistance Advisory Group, Lieutenant Colonel Alfred Medendorp and Lieutenant Colonel Frank Lynn, were killed in the shelling. Memorial cenotaphs were erected for the officers on Greater Kinmen by the ROC Army Kinmen Defense Command (陸軍金門防衛指揮部) in 1992 and 2011 respectively. Lt. Col. Alfred Medendorp was posthumously awarded the Order of the Cloud and Banner in November 1954.

General Chase retired in 1955 at which time he was succeeded by U.S. Brigadier General Lester Bork. In 1967, Major General Richard Ciccolella commanded the MAAG. By this time, the CINCPAC Command History for 1967 gives the title as "MAAG China".

American military advisors were tasked with providing arms and military advice, assisting with Taiwanese military training, implementation of the Sino-American Mutual Defense Treaty, maintaining military contacts, and monitoring Republic of China forces.  In 1957 there were 10,000 Americans in Taiwan, the great majority being CIA and military personnel and their families.

Since 1979, the site of MAAG headquarters in Taipei has been occupied by American Institute in Taiwan/Taipei Main Office, which moved to a new office complex in 2019. The American Club Taipei currently occupies the former site of the MAAG NCO Open Mess - Club 63.

Notes

References 
 Conboy, Kenneth and James Morrison (1995), Shadow War: The CIA's Secret War in Laos. Paladin Press. .

Further reading
 Bryan Gibby, "American Advisors to the Republic of Korea: America’s First Commitment in the Cold War, 1946–1950", pp. 81–110, in

External links
 

Military units and formations of the United States in the Vietnam War
United States military presence in other countries
United States Security Assistance Organizations